Valentine Nonyela (born 23 September 1969) is a Nigerian–British actor. He appeared in many TV programmes of the late 1980s and 1990s, including  BBC television series South of the Border, The Bill, London's Burning, Holby City and A Touch of Frost. Apart from his career in the television industry, he also co-starred in several films, like the Isaac Julien film Young Soul Rebels and the James Bond film Casino Royale. He recently appeared in ITV's House Guest In The Sun, saying that he lives in Cyprus with his wife and two children named Ramai Nonyelu and Arinze-tross Nonyelu.

Filmography

References

 Queer looks: perspectives on lesbian and gay film and video by Marthe Geven, Pratibha parmar, John Greyson 1993

External links

Photograph

1970 births
British male television actors
Living people
British male film actors